Lu Chen is a Chinese-born American neuroscientist, who is a Professor of Neurosurgery, and of Psychiatry and Behavioral Sciences at Stanford University, and is a member of the Stanford Neurosciences Institute. She was previously an Associate Professor of Neurobiology and a member of the Helen Wills Neuroscience Institute at the University of California, Berkeley.

Life
She was born and raised in China.  She graduated from the University of Southern California with a PhD in Neurobiology in 1998. She studied with Richard F. Thompson.

Her husband is Thomas C. Südhof, a Nobel laureate in physiology and medicine and a professor at Stanford University. Her former husband, Shaowen Bao, is a professor of neuroscience.

Research
The long-term goal of Chen's research is to understand the cellular and molecular mechanisms that underlie synapse function during behavior in the developing and mature brain, and how synapse function is altered during mental retardation. Chen discovered an important role of retinoic acid in synaptic scaling.

Awards
2005 MacArthur Fellows Program
2004 Beckman Young Investigators Award

References

University of Southern California alumni
University of California, Berkeley College of Letters and Science faculty
American neuroscientists
Chinese expatriates in the United States
MacArthur Fellows
Living people
1972 births